Samuli Mansikka (28 July 1978 – 24 March 2015), was a Finnish mountaineer, trekking guide and expedition leader. He was president of the Finnish Alpine Club and a member of The Explorers Club. He was best known for climbing the world's 8000m peaks, many of them solo and without supplementary oxygen. He died in a fall while descending from Annapurna, his tenth 8000m summit.

8000m peak record 

Mansikka climbed ten of the world's fourteen 8000m peaks. All of these climbs, with the exception of Everest and Lhotse, were completed without supplementary oxygen. He also reached the top of an eleventh, Shishapangma, but in poor visibility could not be sure whether he had reached the Main Summit or the slightly lower Central Summit.
 2006. Cho Oyu, Tibet. Normal route without supplementary oxygen. Summit.
 2008. Lhotse, Nepal. Normal route. Summit.
 2008. Cho Oyu, Tibet. Normal route without supplementary oxygen. Summit.
 2009. Everest, Nepal. Southeast Ridge route. Summit.
 2009. Lhotse, Nepal. Normal route. Reached c.7950 m.
 2009. Manaslu, Nepal. Normal route, solo without supplementary oxygen. Summit.
 2010. Gasherbrum II, Pakistan. Normal route without supplementary oxygen. Summit.
 2011. Dhaulagiri, Nepal. Normal route, solo without supplementary oxygen. Summit.
 2012. Shishapangma, Tibet. Inaki Ochoa route without supplementary oxygen. Reached c.8000m.
 2013. Makalu, Nepal. Northwest Face, solo without supplementary oxygen. Summit.
 2014. Kangchenjunga, Nepal. Southwest Face, solo without supplementary oxygen. Summit.
 2014. K2, Pakistan. Normal route, solo without supplementary oxygen. Summit.
 2015. Annapurna, Nepal. French route, solo without supplementary oxygen. Summit.

Death on Annapurna 

According to Dreamers Destination, a Nepalese operator he was using for his base camp services, Mansikka reached the summit of Annapurna at 2.45pm on 24 March 2015, along with six Sherpas and six paying clients from the Dreamers Destination team. What happened next is unclear, but Mansikka and Pemba Sherpa descended ahead of the rest of the group and somehow became separated from them. It was apparent they had died from a fall.

Because both climbers fell together, there was speculation they were roped together at the time. However, the Finnish magazine, Retki, later claimed this was not the case. An article a few days after his death stated that Mansikka had urged the other climbers on when they considered turning back short of the summit. It went on to say Mansikka had started his descent alone, but that Pemba Sherpa later caught up with him.

On 28 March Mansikka's friend and climbing partner Phil Crampton organised a rescue mission to try and recover the bodies using helicopter and longline technique, but this was aborted when it was felt the lives of the rescuers were being put in too much danger. Both bodies remain on the mountain where they fell.

References

Finnish mountain climbers
Finnish summiters of Mount Everest
1978 births
2015 deaths
Mountaineering deaths